Al Gorg (also Romanized as Āl Gorg and Ālgorg; also known as Deh-e ‘Alī Gorgī) is a village in Margan Rural District, in the Central District of Hirmand County, Sistan and Baluchestan Province, Iran. At the 2006 census, its population was 601, in 115 families.

References 

Populated places in Hirmand County